The Thin Man is a 1934 American pre-Code comedy-mystery film directed by W. S. Van Dyke and based on the 1934 novel of the same name by Dashiell Hammett. The film stars William Powell and Myrna Loy as Nick and Nora Charles, a leisure-class couple who enjoy copious drinking and flirtatious banter. Nick is a retired private detective who left his very successful career when he married Nora, a wealthy heiress accustomed to high society. Their wire-haired fox terrier Asta was played by canine actor Skippy. In 1997, the film was added to the United States National Film Registry having been deemed "culturally, historically, or aesthetically significant".

The film's screenplay was written by Albert Hackett and Frances Goodrich, a married couple. In 1934, the film was nominated for the Academy Award for Best Picture. The titular "Thin Man" is not Nick Charles, but the man Charles is initially hired to find – Clyde Wynant (part way through the film, Charles describes Wynant as a "thin man with white hair"). The "Thin Man" moniker was thought by many viewers to refer to Nick Charles and, after a time, it was used in the titles of sequels as if referring to Charles. It was followed by five sequels.

Plot

Dorothy Wynant discusses with her father Clyde about her upcoming wedding. She discusses the fact with her father that her fiance knows all about her family yet still wants to marry her. Later, her father discovers that his $50,000 bonds are missing. They were supposed to be a wedding present for his daughter. They were left in his safe. The only other person who knows the combination of the safe would be his secretary, Julia. He confronts Julia about his missing bonds. She confesses that she cashed them in and has only $25,000 left. He threatens to call the police unless she comes up with the rest of the $25,000.

Nick Charles is a retired detective and former client of Clyde's. Nick and his wealthy wife, Nora, live in San Francisco but are visiting New York City for Christmas, staying in a glamorous apartment-like suite at the Hotel Normandie. While in New York, Nick is pressed back into service by Dorothy, as her father, the "Thin Man" of the movie title, was supposed to have left on a secret business trip with a promise to return home before his daughter's wedding, but he has mysteriously disappeared. She convinces Nick to take the case, with the assistance of his socialite wife, who is eager to see him in action again. What appears to be a missing person situation rapidly turns into a murder case, when Julia Wolf, Clyde's former secretary and girlfriend, is found dead, and evidence points to Clyde as the prime suspect. Dorothy refuses to believe that her father is guilty. Nick and Police Lieutenant Guild visit Nunheim, a frequent source for the lieutenant. After being pressed for information, Nunheim excuses himself momentarily, only to slip away down the fire escape. He arranges a meeting with the yet-unidentified murderer (someone whose face is not yet shown) to collect $5,000 from him. When Nunheim arrives, however, he is immediately shot four times and killed.

On a hunch, Nick soon visits Wynant's closed shop in the dead of night and unearths a skeletonized, but fully dressed, body, buried under the floor. In the dark shop, Wynant's bookkeeper, Tanner, suddenly appears. After that, the police—whom Nick had called once he found the body—arrive and concludes that Wynant committed the murders of Julia and now this newly discovered body. They assume that the remains belong to the "Fat Man"—a long-ago enemy of Wynant's—because of its oversized clothing with a belt buckle bearing an "R" (for "Rosewater", that notorious figure's surname). But Nick has already all but solved the case—and soon invites the full cast of suspects to an elegant dinner party.

There, as planned, the murderer is exposed. Nick—who had accompanied the medical examiner when he X-rayed the buried body—theorizes that the clothes were planted to hide the body's true identity, as the X-ray revealed telltale shrapnel, presumably from an old war wound, in one leg, the exact same injury that had plagued the "Thin Man": the missing Wynant. Nick deduces that the real culprit murdered Clyde once he discovered that the killer had been embezzling from him, and then the culprit murdered his own accomplice, Julia Wolf, because she knew about Clyde's murder, and after that, he murdered Nunheim since he had witnessed Julia's murder and was blackmailing him.

Nick unfurls more of his theory to the dinner guests. Herbert MacCauley, Clyde's attorney, panics and tries to shoot Nick. Nick punches him out and declares MacCauley to be the murderer.

Finally, Nick and Nora, along with Dorothy and her new husband, Tommy, celebrate as they ride a luxury train back to California. Nora, in the lower bunk, wants to sleep with Asta, but Nick tosses Asta to the upper bunk and joins Nora himself. Asta looks down on the couple and covers his eyes with his paw.

Cast

Cast notes:
 Nat Pendleton reprised the role of Lt. Guild in 1939's Another Thin Man.

Production

Screenplay
The film was based on the novel of the same name by Dashiell Hammett, released in January 1934. Hammett's novel drew on his experiences as a union-busting Pinkerton detective in Butte, Montana. Hammett based Nick and Nora's banter upon his rocky on-again, off-again relationship with playwright Lillian Hellman.

MGM paid Hammett $21,000 for the screen rights to the novel. The screenplay was written by Albert Hackett and Frances Goodrich, who had been married for three years. Director W.S. Van Dyke encouraged them to use Hammett's writing as a basis only, and to concentrate on providing witty exchanges for Nick and Nora.

Casting
Van Dyke convinced MGM executives to let Powell and Loy portray the lead characters despite concerns that Powell was too old and strait-laced to play Nick Charles and that Loy had become typecast in exotic femme fatale roles.

Skippy played Asta, the dog of Nick and Nora. Skippy was subsequently cast in two screwball comedy classics, The Awful Truth (1937) and Bringing Up Baby (1938).

Filming

The film was shot with a budget of $226,408 by cinematographer James Wong Howe. For Powell's first scene in the film, Van Dyke told him to take the cocktail shaker, go to the bar and just walk through the scene while the crew checked lights and sound. Powell did it, throwing in some lines and business of his own. Suddenly he heard Van Dyke say, "That's it! Print it!" The director had decided to shoot the scene without Powell knowing it so that he would be as relaxed and natural as possible.

Van Dyke often did not bother with cover shots if he felt the scene was right on the first take, reasoning that actors "lose their fire" if they have to do something over and over. It was a lot of pressure on the actors, who often had to learn new lines and business immediately before shooting, without the luxury of retakes, but Loy credited much of the appeal of the film to Van Dyke's pacing and spontaneity. He paid the most attention to Powell and Loy's easy banter between takes and their obvious enjoyment of each other's company and worked it into the movie. The director often encouraged and incorporated improvisation and off-the-cuff details into the picture. In order to keep her entrance fresh and spontaneous, Van Dyke did not tell Loy about it until right before they shot it.

Powell loved working so much with Loy because of her naturalness, her professionalism, and her lack of any kind of "diva" temperament. Of her, Powell said: 
When we did a scene together, we forgot about technique, camera angles, and microphones. We weren't acting. We were just two people in perfect harmony. Myrna, unlike some actresses who think only of themselves, has the happy faculty of being able to listen while the other fellow says his lines. She has the give and takes of acting that brings out the best.

According to Loy, the actors were not allowed to interact between takes with the dog Skippy; trainers felt it would break his concentration. Skippy once bit Loy during filming.

Although she had great compliments for Powell's charm and wit, Maureen O'Sullivan (who played the daughter of Wynant) later said she did not enjoy making the picture because her part was so small and the production was so rushed.

The scene of Nick shooting the ornaments off the tree was added after Powell playfully picked up an air gun and started shooting ornaments the art department was putting up.

Loy wrote that the biggest problem during shooting was the climactic dinner party scene in which Nick reveals the killer. Powell complained that he had too many lines to learn and could barely decipher the complicated plot he was unraveling. It was the one scene when several retakes were necessary, which brought up an entirely new problem. The script called for oysters to be served to the dinner guests and, in take after take, the same plate of oysters was brought out under the hot lights. Loy recalled that "they began to putrefy. By the time we finished that scene, nobody ever wanted to see another oyster".

Reception
The film was released on May 25, 1934, to overwhelmingly positive reviews, with special praise for the chemistry between Loy and Powell. Mordaunt Hall of The New York Times called it "an excellent combination of comedy and excitement", and the film appeared on the Times year-end list of the ten best of the year. Variety reported that "The Thin Man was an entertaining novel, and now it's an entertaining picture. For its leads the studio couldn't have done better than to pick Powell and Miss Loy, both of whom shade their semi-comic roles beautifully". Film Daily raved: "The screen seldom presents a more thoroughly interesting piece of entertainment than this adaptation of Dashiell Hammett's popular novel. The rapid fire dialogue is about the best heard since talkies, and it is delivered by Powell and Miss Loy to perfection". John Mosher of The New Yorker wrote that Loy and Powell played their parts "beautifully", adding: "All the people of the book are there, and I think the final scenes of the solution of the mystery are handled on a higher note than they were in print". Louella Parsons called it "the greatest entertainment, the most fun and the best mystery-drama of the year". The Chicago Tribune said that it was "exciting", "amusing" and "fat with ultra, ultra-sophisticated situations and dialog". It also called Powell and Loy "delightful". Harrison Carroll of The Los Angeles Herald-Express wrote that it was "one of the cleverest adaptations of a popular novel that Hollywood has ever turned out".

The film was such a box-office success that it spawned five sequels:
 After the Thin Man (1936)
 Another Thin Man (1939)
 Shadow of the Thin Man (1941)
 The Thin Man Goes Home (1945)
 Song of the Thin Man (1947)

The Thin Man was voted one of the ten best pictures of 1934 by Film Daily'''s annual poll of critics.

In 2002, critic Roger Ebert added the film to his list of Great Movies. Ebert praised William Powell's performance in particular, stating that Powell "is to dialogue as Fred Astaire is to dance. His delivery is so droll and insinuating, so knowing and innocent at the same time, that it hardly matters what he's saying".

The Japanese filmmaker Akira Kurosawa cited The Thin Man as one of his favorite films.

In 2000 American Film Institute designated the film as one of the great comedies in the previous hundred years of cinema.

The film is 32nd on the American Film Institute's 2000 list AFI's 100 Years...100 Laughs and was nominated for the following lists:

 1998: AFI's 100 Years...100 Movies
 2002: AFI's 100 Years...100 Passions
 2003: AFI's 100 Years...100 Heroes & Villains:
 Nick & Nora Charles – Heroes
 2005: AFI's 100 Years...100 Movie Quotes:
 Nora Charles: "They say you were shot in the tabloids".
 Nick Charles: "They never got near my tabloids".
 2007: AFI's 100 Years...100 Movies (10th Anniversary Edition)
 2008: AFI's 10 Top 10:
 Mystery Film

Box officeThe Thin Man earned total theater rentals of $1,423,000, with $818,000 from the US and Canada and $605,000 in other foreign rentals, resulting in a profit of $729,000.

Trailer

The trailer contained specially filmed footage in which Nick Charles (William Powell) is seen on the cover of the Dashiell Hammett novel The Thin Man. Nick Charles then steps out of the cover to talk to fellow detective Philo Vance (also played by Powell) about his latest case. Charles mentions he hasn't seen Vance since The Kennel Murder Case, a film in which Powell played Vance, released in October 1933, just seven months prior to the release of The Thin Man. Charles goes on to explain to Vance that his latest case revolves around a "tall, thin man" (referring to Clyde Wynant's character), just before clips of the film are shown.

AdaptationsThe Thin Man was dramatized as a radio play on an hour-long broadcast of Lux Radio Theatre on June 8, 1936. William Powell, Myrna Loy, Minna Gombell, Porter Hall, William Henry, and Thomas Jackson reprised their film roles, and W. S. Van Dyke was host.

Home media
Long available on VHS and DVD, The Thin Man was released on Blu-ray Disc by the Warner Archive Collection on July 30, 2019. The 1080p high-definition master was made from a 4K restoration based on new transfers of the picture's best surviving film elements, with digital correction of a multitude of defects seen in earlier home-media releases. Blu-ray.com reported that the film "looks exceptional and, aside from a true 4K option, will likely never get a better home video release". Extras include the theatrical trailer, the 1936 Lux Radio Theatre broadcast, and the 1958 second-season premiere of the NBC television series.

In popular culture
 The TV series The Thin Man ran from 1957 through 1959, starring Peter Lawford and Phyllis Kirk.
 In the 1976 comedy spoof movie Murder by Death, the characters of Nick and Nora Charles became Dick and Dora Charleston, played by David Niven and Maggie Smith.Looney, Deborah "Murder by Death (1976)" TCM.com
 In the 2005 animated film Hoodwinked!, the character Nicky Flippers, a frog detective voiced by David Ogden Stiers, was based on Nick Charles.
 Creators Rachel Cohn and David Levithan named their lead characters in the 2008 film Nick & Norah's Infinite Playlist as a homage to the characters in The Thin Man''.
 The 2022 science fiction novel "The Spare Man" by Mary Robinette Kowal is a sci-fi take on the Nick and Nora characters, but set in space.

References

External links

 
 
 
 
 
 The Thin Man on Lux Radio Theater: June 8, 1936
 

The Thin Man films
1934 films
1934 comedy films
1934 crime films
1930s American films
1930s Christmas films
1930s comedy mystery films
1930s comedy thriller films
1930s crime comedy films
1930s English-language films
American black-and-white films
American comedy mystery films
American comedy thriller films
American crime comedy films
American detective films
Films adapted into radio programs
Films adapted into television shows
Films directed by W. S. Van Dyke
Films set in New York City
Metro-Goldwyn-Mayer films
Murder mystery films
United States National Film Registry films
Philo Vance